Naoko Sakamoto may refer to:

 Naoko Sakamoto (runner) (born 1980), Japanese long-distance runner
 Naoko Sakamoto (softball) (born 1985), Japanese softball player